In 1887, while he was residing in Paris, Vincent van Gogh executed an oil painting commonly known as Wheat Field with a Lark. It is housed in the Van Gogh Museum in Amsterdam, where it is known as Korenveld met patrijs (English: Wheat field with partridge).

Its lower half shows a partially harvested field of wheat under a sky patterned with light clouds. Poppies and cornflowers wave in the wind alongside the crop. A lark takes flight towards the upper left of the canvas.

References

Paintings by Vincent van Gogh
Paintings of Paris by Vincent van Gogh
1887 paintings
Collections of the Van Gogh Museum
Birds in art
Farming in art